League tables for teams participating in Kolmonen, the fourth tier of the Finnish soccer league system, in 2008.

League Tables 2008

Helsinki and Uusimaa

Section 1

Section 2

Section 3

Play-offs

South-East Finland (Kaakkois-Suomi)

Central (Keski-Suomi)

Eastern Finland (Itä-Suomi)

Northern Finland (Pohjois-Suomi)

Central Ostrobothnia and Vaasa (Keski-Pohjanmaa and Vaasa)

Keski-Pohjanmaa - Spring

Vaasa - Spring

Upper Section - Autumn

Satakunta

Tampere

Turku and Åland (Turku and Ahvenanmaa)

Footnotes

References and sources
Finnish FA
ResultCode
Kolmonen (jalkapallo) 

Kolmonen seasons
4
Finland
Finland